Jozi Nuggets is a South African basketball club based in Johannesburg. The team plays in the Johannesburg Basketball League (JBL), in which it won championships in 2017 and 2018. The club won the National Club Championship in 2019.

The club’s develops its own players from age 10 and some are playing for the senior men’s and women’s team. The club has partnered with the City of Joburg for programs including development of young players within the inner city and surrounding areas. The club was founded in 1998 and revived in 2008. The club has a men’s, women’s and junior program and also has players representing the National Team of South Africa.

In 2019, the Nuggets represented South Africa in the qualifying tournaments for the Basketball Africa League (BAL). On 23 October 2019, Nuggets won its first game at the continental level when it beat Dolphins 68–60.

Honours

Men's team
Johannesburg Basketball League
Winners (2): 2017, 2018

Swaziland Invitational Basketball Tournament  
Winners (2): 2016, 2017

Johannesburg Invitational Tournament
Winners: 2019

Inner City Super League
Winners (2): 2015, 2016

Ashraf Lodewyk Memorial Tournament
Winners (3): 2014, 2015, 2016

National Club Championships
Winner: 2019

Women's team

2017 Silver medalists-Johannesburg Basketball League(JBL)

2018 Winner-JBL Women’s Tournament 

2019 Winner-JBL Women’s Tournament 

2019 Silver-Johannesburg Basketball Leagie
2021 National Club Champs

In African competitions
BAL Qualifiers (1 appearance)
2019 – First Round

Swaziland Invitational Tournament
2012-Runners up
2013-Semi Finals
2014-Semi Finals
2015-Never invited 
2016-Winner(Men)
2017-Winner(Men), Women(Quarter Finals)
2018-Quarter Finals(Women)
2019-Quarter Finals(Women)

References

External links
Twitter profile

Basketball teams in South Africa
Basketball teams established in 1998
Sport in Johannesburg
Road to BAL teams